The Karawanks Tunnel may refer to two tunnels connecting Austria and Slovenia under the Karawanks mountain range:
Karawanks Tunnel (motorway), a 7864-metre-long motorway tunnel, completed in 1991
Karawanks Tunnel (railway), a 7976-metre-long railway tunnel, completed in 1906